Kinetic Luna is a 50 cc moped that was introduced by Kinetic Engineering in India in 1972.  The Kinetic Luna continues to be produced and marketed in India. It is marketed in the USA as Kinetic TFR. A 35 cc version, the Luna Wings, was also produced. 
The original Luna of 1972 was a licensed copy of Piaggio Ciao moped. It has since been updated by Kinetic until the end of production in early 2000s.

Models
Luna kinetic
Luna TFR
Luna TFR Plus
Luna Double plus
Luna Wings
Luna Magnum
Luna Super

References

Kinetic motorcycles
Motorcycles of India
Mopeds
Vehicles introduced in 1972